Vladimir Kovačević (born 11 November 1992) is a Serbian footballer who plays for Russian club Dynamo Makhachkala.

Career
Kovačević is a product of Vojvodina youth system.

Vojvodina
He made his professional debut for Vojvodina against Javor in May 2010, but due to extremely strong competition for two central defender positions, he never managed to make an impact at the club.

Hajduk Kula
Kovačević was loaned to another Serbian SuperLiga side Hajduk Kula for 2010–11 season. There he didn't make an instant impact, but as the season progressed, he established himself as one of the club's top defenders. He scored his first senior goal against Red Star Belgrade in surprise 2–0 home win.

Proleter Novi Sad
After loan return from Hajduk, Kovačević spent an entire season 2011–12 trying to break into the first team, but has only made 3 league appearances. Next season he was loaned out to local Serbian First League side Proleter Novi Sad.

Spartak Subotica
At the beginning of August 2013 Kovačević signed with Serbian SuperLiga side Spartak Subotica. During his stay, Vladimir finally managed to break into the first team. In three seasons, he reached two Serbian Cup semifinals with the club(in 2013–14 and 2015–16). Kovačević was primarily used as a center-back, but was equally successful when deployed as a defensive midfielder. His above-par performances drew attention of multiple clubs, including his former club Vojvodina.

Second spell at Vojvodina
On 1 June 2016, Kovačević re-signed for Vojvodina, on a three-year-deal.

Kortrijk
After 6 months in Vojvodina, on 28 January 2017, Kovačević signed four-and-a-half-year-deal with Belgian side Kortrijk.

Sheriff Tiraspol
On 20 June 2018, Moldovan club Sheriff Tiraspol announced they had signed Kovačević on loan from Kortrijk. Kovačević left Sheriff Tiraspol a year later when his loan expired, having played 24 games and scoring three goals.

Third spell at Vojvodina 
On 27 July 2020, Kovačević signed a two-year-deal with Vojvodina.

International career
Kovačević made his international debut for the Serbian national team in an friendly 3–0 loss to Qatar.

References

External links
 
 Vladimir Kovačević stats at utakmica.rs 
 
 
 
 
 

1992 births
People from Odžaci
Living people
Serbian footballers
Serbia youth international footballers
Serbia under-21 international footballers
Serbia international footballers
Association football defenders
FK Vojvodina players
FK Hajduk Kula players
FK Proleter Novi Sad players
FK Spartak Subotica players
K.V. Kortrijk players
FC Sheriff Tiraspol players
FC Dynamo Makhachkala players
Serbian SuperLiga players
Serbian First League players
Belgian Pro League players
Moldovan Super Liga players
Serbian expatriate footballers
Serbian expatriate sportspeople in Belgium
Expatriate footballers in Belgium
Serbian expatriate sportspeople in Moldova
Expatriate footballers in Moldova
Serbian expatriate sportspeople in Russia
Expatriate footballers in Russia